Random Spirit Lover is Sunset Rubdown's third LP, released on October 9, 2007. The album marked Sunset Rubdown's change from the Absolutely Kosher Records label to the Bloomington, Indiana-based Jagjaguwar records. The album was recorded in January 2007 at Breakglass Studios in Montreal with Jace Lasek and Dave Smith.

The album was leaked on July 27, 2007.

The album was voted in as the 14th best album of 2007 by readers of Pitchfork, while garnering the most 1st place votes.

Track listing 
 "The Mending of the Gown" – 5:36
 "Magic vs. Midas" – 5:59
 "Up on Your Leopard, Upon the End of Your Feral Days" – 4:47
 "The Courtesan Has Sung" – 4:31
 "Winged/Wicked Things" – 4:46
 "Colt Stands Up, Grows Horns" – 4:54
 "Stallion" – 6:45
 "For the Pier (and Dead Shimmering)" – 5:14
 "The Taming of the Hands That Came Back to Life" – 6:06
 "Setting vs. Rising" – 2:23
 "Trumpet, Trumpet, Toot! Toot!" – 5:28
 "Child-Heart Losers" – 2:01

References

External links
 Stereogum Premature Evaluation
 "Winged/Wicked Things" (Free Live Recording Download from Daytrotter)
 "The Mending of the Gown" (Free Live Recording Download from Daytrotter)

2007 albums
Sunset Rubdown albums
Jagjaguwar albums